Miloslav Strnad (born 3 December 1981) is a Czech football player who currently plays for Táborsko.

Strnad joined Gambrinus liga side FC Baník Ostrava in 2009, signing a two-year contract making it his first spell at a top-flight club. He marked his first league start for the club by scoring in the first minute of a 2–2 draw with FK Teplice.

Strnad signed for Vlašim on a one-year loan deal from Baník Ostrava in the summer of 2010, a year later signing for Vlašim permanently in the summer of 2011. Despite finishing the autumn part of the 2011–12 Czech 2. Liga as top scorer, Strnad headed to Sokolov on a six-month loan deal in January 2012.

Career statistics

References

External links
 

Czech footballers
Czech First League players
FC Baník Ostrava players
1981 births
Living people
Association football forwards
FC Sellier & Bellot Vlašim players
FK Čáslav players
FK Baník Sokolov players